The 1881 Minnesota tornado outbreak was a deadly tornado outbreak that struck southern Minnesota on July 15–16, 1881. At least six tornadoes touched down between 2:00 pm – 6:00 pm CST, killing 24 people and injuring at least 123. The deadliest tornado of the outbreak, an F4 that killed 20 people in and near New Ulm, was likely a tornado family that may have caused F5 damage to rural farmsteads. Six people died in New Ulm, where people from nearby settlements had congregated to avoid Native American attacks.

Confirmed tornadoes

July 15 event

July 16 event

See also
 Climate of Minnesota
 List of North American tornadoes and tornado outbreaks

References

Bibliography

External links
 Minnesota Tornado History and Statistics
 Gendisasters.com 

F4 tornadoes by date
Minnesota,1881-07-15
Tornadoes of 1881
Tornadoes in Minnesota
1881 in Minnesota
1881 natural disasters in the United States
July 1881 events